Amanita hygroscopia (/æməˈnaɪtə /ha͡ɪɡɹəskˈo͡ʊpi͡ə), also known as the pink-gilled destroying angel is a deadly poisonous fungus, one of many in the genus Amanita. It was first described by William Chambers Coker in 1917. 

Resembling several edible species, most notably Agaricus campestris, poisonings are not uncommon from A. hygroscopica. Amatoxins, the class of toxins found in these mushrooms, are thermostable: they resist changes due to heat, so their toxic effects are not reduced by cooking.

Description 
The cap is 25 mm wide and hemispheric. The gills are adnate, crowded, medium broad, entire, white, unchanging.

The stem is about 30 × 5 - 8 mm, narrowing upward, smooth, glabrous, white, unchanging when bruised. The ring is fixed 10 mm from the top of the stem, very short, skirt-like, grooved by the gills above, white, persistent. The bulb is ovoid, white, 20 × 15 mm. The volva is neither appressed nor widely spreading, the edge is either 3-lobed or ragged.

Edibility 
A. hygroscopica is a deadly poisonous fungus. The mushroom is odorless and tasteless.

Toxicity 
The principal toxic constituent is α-amanitin, an elective inhibitor of RNA polymerase II and III, which causes liver and kidney failure. 15% of those poisoned will die within 10 days and those who survive are at risk of lifelong, permanent liver damage.

There is no antidote for amanitin poisoning; treatment is mainly supportive (gastric lavage, activated carbon, fluid resuscitation).

See also 
 List of Amanita species
 List of deadly fungi

References 

hygroscopica
Fungi of the United States
Poisonous fungi
Fungi described in 1917